Triaxomera puncticulata is a moth of the family Tineidae. It found in Japan (Honshu, Kyushu).

The wingspan is 10–14 mm for males and 14–16 mm for females. The forewings are black with white irregular narrow transverse striae around the basal one-third, halfway and two-thirds of the costa. There are two to three spots on the dorsum running obliquely towards the costa and two to three minute spots on the apical area. The hindwings are dark brown. Adults are on wing from mid to late May.

The larvae possibly feed on decaying wood of Fagus crenata.

Etymology
The species name refers to the small white spots on the forewings and is derived from Latin puncticulata.

References

Moths described in 2002
Nemapogoninae